Repossi is an Italian jewelry house, founded in 1957 in Turin by Costantino Repossi. The house is built around three generations that follow each other from father to son, and from father to daughter.

After studying industrial design, Costantino Repossi took over the Italian workshops of his father during the post-war period. He opened the first eponymous boutique in Turin. His son Alberto took up the reins of creation at a very young age, opening his first boutique in Monte-Carlo in 1979 and then in Paris in 1986 at 6 Place Vendôme. After an artistic and intellectual career far from the tradition of jewelry, Gaia Repossi takes over at 21 the artistic and creative direction of the House.

History

In 1974 the founder's son, Alberto Repossi, took over the direction of the business.

In 2007 Gaia Repossi, daughter of Alberto, became the creative director of the brand.
She is the third generation of her family to take over the company.
She studied at Paris Fine Art School, Beaux-Arts de Paris.

The brand's is furthermore associated with contemporary art through collaborations with artists like Vivian Sassen among others. Collection presentations were held at art galleries, like the Gagosian Gallery in LeBourget.

Repossi's designs are said to be modern and minimal.

Following the death of Princess Diana in 1997, Repossi made headlines due to claims that Dodi Fayed had purchased a ring from the Paris store, in order to propose to Diana. The veracity of these claims has since been disputed.

In 2013, Gaia Repossi won the "Best jewelry designer of the Year" award at the Elle Style Awards.

In 2015, a partnership with luxury conglomerate LVMH was announced through which LVMH acquired a minority share in the fine jewelry house.

In 2016, Repossi's Paris flagship store, located on historical Place Vendôme, re-opened after the redesigning by Dutch avant-garde architect Rem Koolhaas and his OMA practice.

References

Jewellery designers
LVMH brands